Balettan is a 2003 Indian Malayalam-language family drama film directed by V. M. Vinu, written by T. A. Shahid, and produced by M. Mani. It stars Mohanlal in the title role, along with Devayani, Nedumudi Venu, Harisree Ashokan, Riyaz Khan, Innocent, and Jagathy Sreekumar. The film's songs were composed by M. Jayachandran, while the background score was provided by C. Rajamani. The film was released on 28 August 2003. Balettan was the highest-grossing Malayalam film of the year at the box office and ran over than 200 days in theatres. It won the Kerala Film Critics Association Awards for Best Popular Film. The film was remade in Telugu as Rajababu (2006).

Plot 

Athaniparampil Balachandran (Balan) is an ordinary family man, living with his wife Radhika, two children, his younger brother and father, a locally respected retired postmaster. Balan struggles to balance his professional life amidst his multiple interests, which includes amateur theater and a penchant for helping others, including strangers. Nevertheless, he leads a cheerful life, with the support of his loving family, and has earned the status of being a major figure in the local society, earning the pet name Balettan (Balan, the elder brother).

However, his good samaritanism, amateur interests and carelessness leads to circumstances that leave him deep in debt and he even gets arrested for cheating on false charges. His father bails him out of the problems with his pension savings, and expects Balan to become more responsible towards his family.

One day, an unexpected cardiac arrest leaves Balan's father in the hospital, and right before his death, he confides to Balan about having another wife and daughter from an illicit relation, and asks him to take care of them, without letting the rest of his family or villagers knowing about the matter.

After his father's death, Balachandran tries to realign his life between the two families and struggles with it. His family starts suspecting him of having an affair, as he is spotted with his half-sister. Amid the chaos, a stranger named Bhadran comes into Balan's life with sinister intentions, and blackmails him, with an eye on his half-sister. The rest of the story tells how Balan manages to solve his problems, including Bhadran's threats and getting his second family accepted in the society.

Cast 

 Mohanlal as Athaniparambil Balachandran (Balettan)
 Devayani as Radhika, Balachandran's wife
 Nedumudi Venu as Menon, Balachandran's father
 Sudha as Lekshmi, Balachandran's mother
 Sudheesh as Sudhi, Balachandran's younger brother
 Lakshana as Balachandran's younger sister
 Riyaz Khan as Bhadran
 Jagathy Sreekumar as K. K. Pisharadi
 Harisree Ashokan as Manikandan
 Nithya Das as Devaki, Balachandran's younger half-sister
 Innocent as Achuthan / Achumama
 Indrans as Koya
 Nandhu as Sukumaran
 Kalasala Babu as Raghavan, Radhika's father
 Bhavani as Sreedevi, Balachandran's father's second wife
 Salu Kuttanadu as Neelandan
 Vimal Raj as Basheer
 Gopika Anil as elder daughter of Balachandran
 Keerthana Anil as younger daughter of Balachandran
 Kalabhavan Mani as Musthafa (cameo appearance)

Soundtrack 
The film features songs were composed by M. Jayachandran with lyrics by Gireesh Puthenchery. The background score was provided by C. Rajamani.

Box office
The film was released on 28 August 2003 during the month of Onam festival. Balettan was a commercial success at the box office, becoming the highest-grossing Malayalam film of the year. The film gave box office success to Mohanlal after a gap of almost two years, which according to Rediff.com, "helped him regain the No.1 spot". It was also the first major box office success of director Vinu.

Awards

References

External links 
 

2003 films
2000s Malayalam-language films
Indian family films
Indian drama films
Malayalam films remade in other languages
Films shot in Thrissur
Films shot in Palakkad
Films shot in Ottapalam
Films scored by M. Jayachandran
Films directed by V. M. Vinu